Ghee is a class of clarified butter that originated in South Asia.

Ghee is also an Irish, English and Chinese surname and may refer to:

 Brandon Ghee (born 1987), American football player
 Chan Tien Ghee, Malaysian businessman
 Gareth Ghee, Irish hurler
 Milt Ghee (1891–1975), American football player

See also 

GHI (disambiguation)
McGhee, a surname
McGee (disambiguation)